Badien Island (also spelled Jazeerat Dadeen) is one of the largest islands on the Nile and the second biggest island in Sudan. Badien Island is home to 40,000 people, all Nubians, who speak Nubian in Mahsiyya and Dongola accents. Badien Island is divided into four administrative districts by north, south, east, and west. Its main industry is agriculture, planting wheat, beans, and other crops. The island obtained an electricity grid in 2005, raising the efficiency of agriculture on the island.

See also

https://en.m.wikipedia.org/wiki/Geography_of_Sudan

References

Islands of the Nile
Northern (state)
River islands of Sudan